Pleasonton may refer to:

 Stephen Pleasonton (c. 1776–1855), United States Treasury Dept. employee
 Augustus Pleasonton (1808–1894), Pennsylvania militia officer and chromotherapy proponent
 Alfred Pleasonton (1824–1897), United States Army officer

See also
 Pleasanton, California, named for Alfred Pleasonton
 Pleasanton, Kansas, named for Alfred Pleasonton
 Pleasanton (disambiguation)